Duncan Horton (born 18 February 1967) is an English footballer who played as a left back in the Football League.

References
Duncan Horton's Career

1967 births
Living people
English footballers
Sportspeople from Maidstone
Association football defenders
Charlton Athletic F.C. players
Maidstone United F.C. (1897) players
Welling United F.C. players
Barnet F.C. players
Wycombe Wanderers F.C. players
English Football League players
National League (English football) players